Dolo is a town in the province of Venice, northern Italy.

Dolo may also refer to:

Places
Dolo (river), a river in the Reggio-Emilia province of Italy
Dolo, Burkina Faso, a town in Burkina Faso
Dolo, Côtes-d'Armor, a town in France
Dolo, Ethiopia, a town in Ethiopia
Dolo, San Jose, a barangay in Camarines Sur, Philippines
Dolo Department, Bougouriba Province, Burkina Faso

People
Dolo Coker (1927–1983), American jazz pianist and composer
Kameng Dolo, Indian politician
Maphutha Dolo (born 1992), South African rugby union player
Saye-Taayor Adolphus Dolo (born 1963), Liberian politician and military officer
Steve Cherundolo (born 1979), nicknamed "Dolo", American association football player

Other uses
Dolo (automobile)
Dolo Airport
Dolo (tablet)

See also
Dolos, multi-ton concrete blocks
Dolow, a town in Somalia
Dulo (disambiguation)
Dulu (disambiguation)
Surnames of Liberian origin